Michael Victor Alexander Lindberg (26 July 1875 in Varoka, Colony of Fiji – 28 April 1951 in Auckland, New Zealand) was a Fijian-born New Zealander who, according to some sources, competed in water polo at the 1900 Summer Olympics in Paris. Poor record keeping is to blame, but also the fact that many of the records that were kept had his name misspelled.

Lindberg was born in Fiji to Swedish and Irish parents who moved to New Zealand when he was young. He arrived in London shortly before the 1900 Olympic Games and joined the Osborne Swimming Club which went on to win the Gold medal. He is not included in the official list of the team (which includes one member who died during the Second Boer War before the Games) but subsequent research concludes that he did compete and that he should be considered a New Zealander. On this basis he is the first New Zealander to have competed at the Olympic Games and the first New Zealand Olympic champion. His descendants were presented with a medal by the president of the New Zealand Olympic Committee, Mike Stanley, in 2014.

See also
 Great Britain men's Olympic water polo team records and statistics
 List of Olympic champions in men's water polo
 List of Olympic medalists in water polo (men)

References

External links
 

Water polo players at the 1900 Summer Olympics
New Zealand male water polo players
1875 births
1951 deaths
Fijian emigrants to New Zealand
New Zealand people of Swedish descent
New Zealand people of Irish descent
Fijian people of Irish descent
Fijian people of Swedish descent
Medalists at the 1900 Summer Olympics
Olympic gold medalists for New Zealand
Olympic medalists in water polo